Saint-Armand, real name Jean-Armand Lacoste, (17 November 1797 – 13 January 1885) was a 19th-century French playwright. He was born and died in Paris. 

Saint-Armand wrote the famous drama l’Auberge des Adrets in collaboration with Benjamin Antier and Polyanthe.

Works 
 La Folle de Toulon, three-act drama, mingled with songs ;
 Marie Rose ou la nuit de Noël, three-act drama, with Adrien Payn, 1832 ;
 Moellen ou l’Enfant du bonheur, tableau populaire in 1 act, mingled with couplets ;
 L’Oraison de Saint Julien, three-act comédie en vaudeville ;
 Péblo ou Le jardinier de Valence, three-act melodrama.

Sources 
 Georges d’Heylli, Gazette anecdotique, littéraire, artistique et bibliographique, t. 1, Paris, Librairie des bibliophiles, 1885, (p. 56)

19th-century French dramatists and playwrights
Writers from Paris
1797 births
1885 deaths